Stagmatophora erebinthia is a moth in the  family Cosmopterigidae. It is found on Fiji.

References

Natural History Museum Lepidoptera generic names catalog

Cosmopteriginae
Moths of Fiji
Moths described in 1921